Bhagyajathakam is a 1962 Indian Malayalam film, directed and produced by P. Bhaskaran. The film stars Sathyan, Sheela (Debut), Adoor Bhasi and Sam in lead roles. The film had musical score by M. S. Baburaj, Irayimman Thampi and Thyagaraja.

Cast
 
Sathyan 
Sheela (Debut) 
Adoor Bhasi 
Sam 
T. S. Muthaiah 
Thomas
Adoor Bhavani 
Adoor Pankajam 
Ali
Bahadoor 
Chithradevi
J. N. Rajam 
Kottarakkara Sreedharan Nair 
M. G. Menon
Nanukkuttan
Pankajavalli

Soundtrack
The music was composed by M. S. Baburaj, Irayimman Thampi and Thyagaraja and the lyrics were written by P. Bhaskaran, Irayimman Thampi and Thyagaraja.

References

External links
 

1962 films
1960s Malayalam-language films
Films directed by P. Bhaskaran